Castellafiume is a comune and town in the Province of L'Aquila in the Abruzzo region of central Italy.

Geography 
The town is located on the slopes of Mount Aurunzo on the northern side of the Nerfa valley, in Marsica. Its territory is crossed by the Liri river and also includes the frazione of Pagliara dei Marsi inhabited by a few dozen residents, about four kilometers from the municipal capital. On the slopes of Mount Girifalco are the ruins of the castle of Pagliara.

References

Cities and towns in Abruzzo
Marsica